The Fire Fighter Fatality Investigation and Prevention Program (FFFIPP) is administered by the National Institute for Occupational Safety and Health (NIOSH), part of the Center for Disease Control and Prevention (CDC). It performs independent investigations of firefighter fatalities in the United States, also referred to as line of duty deaths (LODD). 

The programs goals are: 
 to better define the characteristics of line of duty deaths among firefighters 
 to develop recommendations for the prevention of deaths and injuries
 to disseminate prevention strategies to the fire service.

In 1998, Congress funded NIOSH to implement FFFIPP recognizing the need for further efforts to address the continuing national problem of occupational fire fighter fatalities--an estimated 105 each year. The NIOSH-FFFIPP has a 14-person staff and a $2 million budget and has conducted over 400 investigations since its inception in 1998.

See also
 Crew Resource Management
 Firefighter
 Human Factors Analysis and Classification System
 National Fire Fighter Near-Miss Reporting System
 National Fallen Firefighters Memorial
IAFF Fallen Fire Fighters Memorial

References

External links
 Fire Fighter Fatality Investigation and Prevention Program
 Fire Fighter Fatality Investigation Reports
 National Fallen Firefighters Foundation
 National Fallen Firefighters Memorial Database
 National Fire Fighter Near-Miss Reporting System 
 Firefighter Close Calls
Firefighting in the United States
National Institute for Occupational Safety and Health